Yoann Feynman (born March 20, 1990, Paris) is a French record producer, record label owner and disc-jockey.

Biography
Feynman, born 1990 in Paris, France, is a French composer, recording artist and producer. He is also part of the record label and artist collective FAKE MUSIC.
He started producing when he was 17 and has been putting out records with French artist Monomotion since 2008. He also releases music under various aliases such as YFM  (with Monomotion), FEYNMAN for his disco-house & sample-based songs.

Discography

LPs
Air (2016)

EPs
Illusions II (2017)
Illusions (2015)
Noir (2014)
The Rubber (2013)
Thug House (2013)
Uncontrollable (2008)

Singles
THE WAVE (2017)
Absolut Monarchy (2014)
LZR (2014)
Voodoo (2013)
Fake! (2011)
Fail (2011)
Press Start (2010)
Somewhere (2009)
Fifth of Fifth (2008)

Alias
Feynman - Memories Part I (2014)
YFM - Fallin (feat. Idriss Chebak)  (2013)

Remixes 
 2008:
 Joachim Garraud - Invasion (Yoann Feynman remix) /Virgin - EMI
 2009:
 Stereodudes - Tonteria (Monomotion & Yoann Feynman Remix) /Amused Records
 Oliver Moldan, Prawler - KTR (Yoann Feynman & Monomotion Remix) /Homs Art Records
 2011:
 Ruben Keeney - Malta (Yoann Feynman, Monomotion Remix) /Joia Records
 2014:
 Daft Punk - Instant Crush (Yoann Feynman & Monomotion Edit) /White Label

References

External links
Yoann Feynman website
FAKE MUSIC Recordings website

Interview: DJ Spotlight "Yoann Feynman & Monomotion" (July 3, 2013)

1990 births
Living people
French record producers
French DJs